435 may refer to:

 435, the year.
 435, the number of members of the United States House of Representatives.
 Area code 435
 Arriflex 435, a movie camera
435, song by Tyler, The Creator
 Joint Task Force 435, a former combatant command of United States Forces-Afghanistan
 Tin Tsz stop, station code